Cerodrillia is a genus of sea snails, marine gastropod mollusks in the family Drilliidae.

Species
Species within the genus Cerodrillia include:
 Cerodrillia ambigua Fallon, 2016
 Cerodrillia arubensis Fallon, 2016
 Cerodrillia asymmetrica McLean & Poorman, 1971
 Cerodrillia bahamensis (Bartsch, 1943)
 Cerodrillia brasiliensis Fallon, 2016
 Cerodrillia brunnea Fallon, 2016
 Cerodrillia carminura (Dall, 1889)
 Cerodrillia clappi Bartsch & Rehder, 1939
 Cerodrillia cratera (Dall, 1927)
 Cerodrillia cybele (Pilsbry & Lowe, 1932)
 Cerodrillia elegans Fallon, 2016
 Cerodrillia girardi Lyons, 1972
 Cerodrillia harryleei Fallon, 2016
 Cerodrillia jerrywallsi Poppe, Tagaro & Goto, 2018
 Cerodrillia minima Fallon, 2016
 Cerodrillia nicklesi (Knudsen, 1956)
 Cerodrillia occidua Fallon, 2016
 Cerodrillia perryae Bartsch & Rehder, 1939
 Cerodrillia porcellana Fallon, 2016
 Cerodrillia sanibelensis Fallon, 2016
 Cerodrillia thea (Dall, 1884)
 Cerodrillia yucatecana Fallon, 2016
Species brought into synonymy
 Cerodrillia abdera (Dall, 1919): synonym of Crassispira abdera (Dall, 1919)
 Cerodrillia bealiana (Schwengel & McGinty, 1942): synonym of Drillia bealiana (Schwengel & McGinty, 1942)
 Cerodrillia cervina (Bartsch, 1943): synonym of Viridrillia cervina Bartsch, 1943
 Cerodrillia coccinata (Reeve, 1845): synonym of Splendrillia coccinata (Reeve, 1845)
 Cerodrillia elissa (Dall, 1919): synonym of Leptadrillia elissa (Dall, 1919)
 Cerodrillia fuscocincta (C. B. Adams, 1850): synonym of Crassispira fuscocincta (C. B. Adams, 1850) 
 Cerodrillia hannyae Jong & Coomans, 1988: synonym of Bellaspira hannyae (De Jong & Coomans, 1988)
 Cerodrillia interpunctata E.A. Smith, 1882: synonym of Splendrillia interpunctata (E. A. Smith, 1882)
 Cerodrillia laevisculpta H. von Maltzan, 1883: synonym of Splendrillia coccinata (L.A. Reeve, 1845)
 Cerodrillia schroederi Bartsch & Rehder, 1939: synonym of Lissodrillia schroederi (Bartsch & Rehder, 1939)
 Cerodrillia simpsoni (Simpson, 1886): synonym of Lissodrillia simpsoni (Dall, 1887)
 Cerodrillia verrillii (Dall, 1881): synonym of Lissodrillia verrillii (Dall, 1881)
 Cerodrillia williami (Bartsch, 1943): synonym of Viridrillia williami Bartsch, 1943

References

 Lyons, William G. "New Turridae (Gastropoda: Toxoglossa) from south Florida and the eastern Gulf of Mexico." The Nautilus 86.1 (1972): 3-7.

External links
 Bartsch, Paul, and Harald A. Rehder. "New turritid mollusks from Florida." Proceedings of the United States National Museum (1939)
  Bouchet, P.; Kantor, Y. I.; Sysoev, A.; Puillandre, N. (2011). A new operational classification of the Conoidea. Journal of Molluscan Studies. 77, 273-308
 WMSDB - Worldwide Mollusc Species Data Base: family Drilliidae
 De Jong K.M. & Coomans H.E. (1988) Marine gastropods from Curaçao, Aruba and Bonaire. Leiden: E.J. Brill. 261 pp
 Fallon P.J. (2016). Taxonomic review of tropical western Atlantic shallow water Drilliidae (Mollusca: Gastropoda: Conoidea) including descriptions of 100 new species. Zootaxa. 4090(1): 1-363

 
Gastropod genera